The William Jasper Monument is a monument honoring William Jasper in Savannah, Georgia, United States. Located in Madison Square, the monument was designed by Alexander Doyle and dedicated in 1888.

History 
William Jasper was a sergeant in the Continental Army during the American Revolutionary War. During the Battle of Sullivan's Island in 1776, he earned fame by climbing a parapet under enemy fire to reattach his company's flag after the flagpole was destroyed. For his action, he was commended by John Rutledge, the then-President of South Carolina. He was later killed in action during the siege of Savannah on October 9, 1779.

On February 2, 1888, a monument honoring Jasper was dedicated in Madison Square in Savannah, Georgia. The monument, located near the De Soto Hotel in Savannah, was designed by Alexander Doyle and depicts Jasper during the siege of Savannah. Several prominent Savannah citizens, including Ireland native William Kehoe, had been members of the association responsible for the monument's creation. The mayor and aldermen were present at the monument's dedication, where then-Georgia Governor John Brown Gordon gave a speech. Then-President of the United States Grover Cleveland and First Lady of the United States Frances Cleveland were guests of honor, with the President stopping on his way to Jacksonville, Florida and honoring the occasion with a drive through the city.

In 1957, a Georgia historical marker was erected near the monument.

Design 

The bronze statue of Jasper, topping a granite pedestal, shows him in a heroic pose, holding the Moultrie Flag above his head in his left hand and a sword in his right. Near his feet is his bullet-ridden hat. Three bas-reliefs on the base of the monument depict scenes from Jasper's life. An inscription on the front base of the monument reads:

See also 

 1888 in art

References

Bibliography

External links 
 
 

1888 establishments in Georgia (U.S. state)
1888 sculptures
American Revolutionary War monuments and memorials
Bronze sculptures in Georgia (U.S. state)
Landmarks in Savannah, Georgia
Madison Square (Savannah) monuments
Monuments and memorials in Savannah, Georgia
Outdoor sculptures in Georgia (U.S. state)
Statues in Georgia (U.S. state)